European route E 653 is a European B class road in Hungary and Slovenia, connecting the cities Letenye – Maribor.

Itinerary
The E 653 routes through two European countries:

: Letenye - Tornyiszentmiklós

 : Pince - Murska Sobota - Maribor

External links 
 UN Economic Commission for Europe: Overall Map of E-road Network (2007)

International E-road network
Roads in Hungary
Roads in Slovenia